Pir Mazhar Ul Haq born 14 September 1947  is a Pakistani politician who remained a member of the Provincial Assembly of Sindh from 1988 to 2013. He also remained Senior Minister for Education and Literacy Department Sindh.

Early life
He was born 14 September 1949 to Pir Shahnawaz
He did BA and MA in Political science from University of Sindh.

Political career
Pir Mazhar ul Haq was first elected as a member of the Provincial Assembly of Sindh in general elections of 1988 from Constituency PS-74 (Dadu-IV) as a candidate of Pakistan Peoples Party. Pir Mazhar Ul Haq remained as a minister for housing and town planning, and law and parliamentary affairs respectively. He was the Parliamentary leader of Pakistan Peoples Party in Sindh Assembly, a member of the Central Executive Committee of the Pakistan Peoples Party and the Senior Minister in the Sindh Provincial Government, holding the portfolios of Education and Literacy and Criminal Prosecution Service. He was continuously elected in all the general elections except general elections of 2002. His daughter Marvi Mazhar contested general election from Constituency PS-74 (Dadu-IV) in 2002 and became successful as member of the Provincial Assembly of Sindh.

References

External links 
 Dawn
 Daily
 

Living people
Pakistan People's Party politicians
Sindhi people
Pakistani lawyers
People from Dadu District
Members of the Provincial Assembly of Sindh
1949 births